Harrow the Ninth is a 2020 science fantasy novel by the New Zealand writer Tamsyn Muir. It is the second in Muir's Locked Tomb series, preceded by Gideon the Ninth (2019) and followed by Nona the Ninth (2022) and forthcoming Alecto the Ninth (2023).

Plot
After ascending to Lyctorhood in Gideon the Ninth, Harrowhark "Harrow" Nonagesimus discovers that her process of ascension is somehow imperfect and she lacks many of a Lyctor's standard powers. Despite this, the Emperor fulfills his promise and renews the Ninth House by waking several hundred people from cryogenic sleep and delivering them as new citizens to the Ninth. He apologizes that she does not have a real choice in returning to her House, because the Lyctors are perpetually being chased by Resurrection Beasts, the "ghosts" of the dead planets of the Nine Houses.

In addition, large portions of Harrow’s memory are missing; Ianthe Tridentarius gives her a series of letters written by Harrow herself, giving her detailed instructions for what to do or avoid doing in various scenarios. Ianthe appears to know the reason behind these letters, but has been hexed by this past Harrow to prevent her from any talk of it.

The book alternates between two perspectives; second-person chapters documenting Harrow's experiences in the present as a Lyctor, and third-person chapters that take place in the past, documenting Harrow's memories of the events in Canaan House in Gideon the Ninth. However, her memories of Canaan House directly contradict the events of Gideon, including replacing Gideon herself with Ortus, who is extremely occupied with his telling of an epic poem called The Noniad, as her cavalier. In this version, Harrow reveals to Ortus that she is insane; she frequently reads text that appears differently to other characters, and hallucinates the beautiful woman she saw in the Locked Tomb as a child, whom she refers to as “the Body.” This hallucination is described to have occurred prior to Canaan House as well as to still be occurring in the Emperor's home space station, the Mithraeum.  

Upon arriving at Canaan House, Teacher informs the heirs and cavaliers that there is a beast lying in the heart of the facility called “the Sleeper,” who kills the inverse of the characters that previously died in Gideon; excepting Harrow and Ianthe, all the characters that die in the previous book survive in the flashbacks in Harrow, and vice versa.

In the present day, John, the Emperor of the Nine Houses, explains the nature of his secret war: ten thousand years ago, humanity was wiped out by an unknown cataclysm. John resurrected the entire population of humankind with impossibly powerful magic, but the nature of necromancy caused this action to spawn revenant Resurrection Beasts. John and his Lyctors have been fighting the Resurrection Beasts for millennia; most of the Lyctors have been lost to madness or in battle with the Beasts. 

The surviving Lyctors are Mercymorn, the "Saint of Joy," a vicious and embittered woman; Augustine, the "Saint of Patience," who is flippant and outrageous to hide what seems to be a deadened, ruthless manner; and "Ortus," the stoic, relentless "Saint of Duty." 

These three, along with John, tutor Harrowhark and Ianthe in an extremely dangerous art: the ability to travel to an otherworldly afterlife called The River where they can defeat the Resurrection Beasts by destroying their astral bodies. This travel involves a Lyctor’s soul metaphysically entering the River and letting their consumed cavalier’s soul enter their body in the physical realm in order to defend them while their bodies are vulnerable. However, Harrow’s faulty ascension leaves her unable to do this successfully and so is of limited use in their war. Similarly, Ianthe has difficulty letting her cavalier Naberius take over due to complications with her sword-arm. 

In the present, the Lyctors prepare to battle with the nearest Resurrection Beast, which is set to arrive at the Mithraeum, several years ahead of schedule. Harrow and the others travel to nearby planets and use necromancy to kill them in order to prevent the Beast from feeding on their lifeforces. On one such mission, she encounters Camilla Hect, the cavalier to Palamedes Sextus, believed dead after the events at Canaan House. Camilla is working for the "Blood of Eden," a terrorist organization which seeks to foil the Empire's colonialist ambitions, led by the mysterious Commander Wake. Camilla helps Harrow learn that Palamedes is not truly dead; his spirit is sequestered in a tiny pocket dimension inside the River.

In the past, Harrow learns that this Canaan House is not real—instead it is a similar "pocket" in the ether sustained by beliefs and memories; everyone in the House other than Harrow is, in truth, dead. It is revealed that Harrow's memory loss and seemingly defective Lyctorhood was caused by Harrow and Ianthe performing brain surgery on Harrow to destroy all memories of Gideon. This ensured that Gideon's soul was never truly absorbed by Harrow and she would continue to exist; Harrow loved her too much to allow her to permanently die.

The Canaan House survivors make a last-ditch attempt to fight the Sleeper by casting a spell to summon the spirit of Matthias Nonius, the greatest swordsman in the history of the Ninth House. Matthias's ghost fights the Sleeper to a standstill, energized by Ortus's intense dedication to his legend in The Noniad. They kill the Sleeper—unmasked as a projection of the ghost of Commander Wake—with the help of Matthias Nonius. Marta the Second, Protesilaus the Seventh, and Ortus the Ninth resolve to follow Matthias into the River and face the Resurrection Beast. Abigail and Magnus the Fifth tell Harrow to return to her life.   

In the present, Gideon awakens in Harrow's body, revealing that the second person perspective was not stylistic but in fact literal, portraying Gideon's observation of Harrow's actions from her own point of view, while in the "past," Harrow's perspective was her own. Gideon is amazed to find that Harrow's Lyctoral powers, including a healing factor, have finally begun to work. 

After leaving Harrow's rooms, Gideon encounters Mercymorn and Augustine, who seem terrified by her sudden appearance, as well as Ianthe, who is also less than pleased to see her; she and Ianthe make their way to the Emperor's chambers, where they find him with the corpse of Cytherea the First, now possessed by the ghost of Commander Wake. He attempts to interrogate her, but makes little progress until the other Lyctors arrive.

The Resurrection Beast is repelled by Gideon ("Ortus") the First, Matthias, and the ghosts, but Harrow's consciousness is either unwilling or unable to return to life. Still in a vision of the Locked Tomb where she first met the Body, she climbs into the Body's empty coffin and falls unconscious again.

In the present, it is revealed that Gideon the Ninth was born as a result of Wake artificially inseminating herself with semen stolen from John, making them, in effect, Gideon's parents. Gideon was created to breach the Locked Tomb on the Ninth House and release the prisoner inside. This prisoner is explained to be Alecto, John's cavalier, whose life was used to give John his limitless necromancy powers while preserving her life. Augustine and Mercymorn have sworn revenge on John for never sharing this technique and letting their cavaliers die needlessly. Mercymorn destroys John's body, but he survives and kills her. He then sheds his affable persona and demands the remaining Lyctors' fealty. Ianthe and Gideon the First accept. Gideon the Ninth/Harrow are exempted from the test due to the former being John's daughter and the latter not being present to make a choice. Augustine declines, vowing to fight and die, and throws John into the River in an attempt to kill him permanently. He nearly succeeds in doing so, but Ianthe intervenes and saves John, dooming Augustine to be eaten by a mouth-like portal at the bottom of the River.

At the same time, Gideon the First reveals themself to Gideon the Ninth to actually be Pyrrha Dve, Gideon the First's cavalier, inside his body; similar to Gideon the Ninth, her soul was mostly compartmentalized in the back of his brain for the last ten thousand years, but has occasionally taken over his body. The soul of Gideon the First died fighting the Resurrection Beast, causing Pyrrha to permanently retake control. Gideon and Pyrrha are also pulled into the River; unable to withstand the pressure of the water, Gideon passes out or dies. Six months in the future, an unknown person awakens in an apartment in an unnamed city with Camilla Hect.

Reception 
Constance Grady of Vox writes that Harrow the Ninth is "delightfully, beautifully weird, a book even odder than its predecessor but just as bewitching." Calling the book "gorgeously Baroque," Jason Sheehan of NPR writes that it was "so beautifully, wildly and precariously weird that I couldn't help sliding through page after page, rolling around blood-drunk in the mess of it all." The Library Journal, Publishers Weekly, and Booklist also gave the book positive reviews, as did authors Alix Harrow, Django Wexler, Kiersten White, and Rebecca Roanhorse.

Several reviewers commented on the book's unusual narrative complexity. Liz Bourke of Locus wrote that its "constant shifts of time and perspective, and the unreliability of its narrator, mean that it never quite attains a coherent narrative through-line or a thematic argument that a reader can get their teeth into." Others were more positive, taking this as a conscious stylistic choice on Muir's part: Sheehan called it "wickedly challenging to read, deliberately impossible to comprehend in full". Grady's review concludes "as bewildered as I am at times by Harrow the Ninth, I always enjoy being bewildered by Muir."

References 

21st-century New Zealand novels
Science fantasy novels
2020 science fiction novels
LGBT speculative fiction novels
New Zealand speculative fiction novels
2020s LGBT novels
Tor Books books
New Zealand LGBT novels